Reverend Frank Warfield Crowder (June 6, 1869 – September 27, 1932) was the rector of St. James' Episcopal Church in New York City. He was a supporter of the death penalty.

Biography
He was born on June 6, 1869 to Alexander N. Crowder and Deborah Jane Warfield. He graduated from Dickinson College in 1890.

He was a reverend in the Rowayton section of Norwalk, Connecticut from 1890 to 1893.

He married Louetta Plitt (1868-1936) on April 11, 1893 and they had as their son, Maxwell Alexander Warfield Crowder (1898-1915).

He died on September 27, 1932 at Johns Hopkins Hospital in Baltimore, Maryland. He was buried in Loudon Park Cemetery in Baltimore, Maryland.

References

External links

1869 births
1932 deaths
Dickinson College alumni
Clergy from New York City